American R&B singer Kelly Rowland began her career in 1997 with one of the best-selling American girl groups, Destiny's Child, who have sold around 60 million records worldwide. Her solo videography includes  three DVD albums, forty nine music videos, six films, seven-teen telefilms and seven television shows.

Rowland transitioned into acting with a guest role on the sitcom The Hughleys in 2002, before appearing in other UPN shows such as Eve and Girlfriends in the years of 2003 and 2006. Having played the role of Tammy Hamilton, an apprentice to realtor Toni (Jill Marie Jones) in the sitcom, Rowland initially hoped her three-episode stint would expand to a larger recurring role, but as the show was moved to The CW network the following year plans for a return eventually went nowhere. Also in 2003, she appeared in American Dreams as Martha Reeves of Martha & The Vandellas, singing a version of the group's single "Nowhere to Run".

In 2003, Rowland made her big screen debut in the slasher film Freddy vs. Jason, a crossover film directed by Ronny Yu. Cast as one of the female leads, she portrayed Kia Waterson, the best friend of lead character Lori Campbell, played by Monica Keena. Released to generally mixed reviews from critics, the movie topped the U.S. box office, gaining $36.4 million on its first weekend. Budgeted at $25 million, the film became a financial success, resulting in a worldwide box office total of $114.3 million. The following year, Rowland returned to the big screen, this time for a lead role in the romantic comedy The Seat Filler, starring opposite Duane Martin and Shemar Moore. Executive produced by Will Smith and Jada Pinkett Smith, the film hit theaters in the summer of 2005 and debuted at number eighteen at the box office top twenty. It eventually earned a total domestic gross ticket sales of $10.2 million, and about $18 million worldwide. In the film, for which she recorded two songs, Rowland played a pop star who falls for an awards-show seat filler in which she mistakes for a high-profile entertainment attorney. Released to a limited number of festivals only, the film went straight to DVD in 2006.

In October 2007, Rowland auditioned for the role of Louise, Carrie Bradshaw's assistant, in the 2008 film adaptation of HBO's comedy series Sex and the City. The role eventually went to Jennifer Hudson. In fall 2007, Rowland appeared as a choirmaster on the NBC reality show Clash of the Choirs. Rowland was among superstars like Michael Bolton, Patti LaBelle, Nick Lachey, and Blake Shelton. Rowland's choir finished fifth in the competition. In 2009, she was cast to host Bravo's reality competition series The Fashion Show alongside Isaac Mizrahi. The series premiered on May 7, 2009. On May 30, 2011, Rowland was confirmed as a judge for the eighth series of British television show The X Factor. In addition to her judging stint, Rowland also had a supporting role in the motion picture Think Like a Man (2012), which also starred Keri Hilson, Chris Brown and Gabrielle Union. On April 30, 2012, it was officially announced that Rowland had stepped down as a judge on The X Factor, due to a conflicting schedule. Rowland was awarded Ultimate TV Personality at the 2011 Cosmopolitan Ultimate Women of the Year Awards, and TV Personality of the Year at the 2012 Glamour Women of the Years Awards, for her role on the show. In August 2012, Rowland became a dance master alongside Jason Derülo, for the first season of the Australian dance talent show Everybody Dance Now. However, on August 21, 2012, the show was cancelled due to poor ratings.

DVDs

Music videos

2000s

2010s

2020s

Guest appearances

Filmography

Films

TV shows

TV guest appearances

Commercials

References

Rowland, Kelly
Videography